Rodolfo Vicente (born 21 July 1946) is an Argentine former professional footballer. His nickname was "El Negro".

Club career
Vicente started his football career at Racing Club, where he played until January 1968. There he won the Intercontinental Cup in 1967 against Celtic. Afterwards, he signed to the second division side, Atlanta, where having a good presence, he played for 4 seasons. In the summer of 1972, the transfers of Latin American footballers to Greece, according to the current of the time, brought Vicente alongside Néstor Errea and Hugo Zeer to AEK Athens. He never adapted and didn't to help the team in an overall bad season, where they finished at the fifth place. On 13 September 1972 he scored his first goal at the club in a UEFA Cup game at home against Salgótarján. In the summer of 1973 he returned to Argentina to play for Chacarita and Ferro Carril Oeste, before retiring in 1978.

International career
Vicente competed once for Argentina shaping the final 5–0 win against Colombia, for the Pan American Games in 1967, where he won fifth place.

Honours

Racing Club
Intercontinental Cup: 1967

References

1946 births
Living people
Association football midfielders
Argentine footballers
Racing Club de Avellaneda footballers
AEK Athens F.C. players
Argentine expatriate footballers
Expatriate footballers in Greece